Moss Side is a hamlet on the B5307 road, in the civil parish of Holme East Waver in Cumbria, United Kingdom. Nearby settlements include the villages of Abbeytown and Newton Arlosh.

See also

Listed buildings in Holme East Waver

References 

Philip's Street Cumbria (page 26)

Hamlets in Cumbria
Allerdale